Chionodes lactans is a moth in the family Gelechiidae. It is found in North America, where it has been recorded from New Jersey, North Carolina to Utah and in Arizona.

References

Chionodes
Moths described in 1999
Moths of North America